Pierre Deladonchamps (born 1 June 1978) is a French actor. He is known for starring in the thriller film Stranger by the Lake (2013), for which he won the César Award for Most Promising Actor. He went on to receive a nomination for the César Award for Best Actor for his performance in the drama A Kid (2016). He received the Chevalier of the Order of Arts and Letters by the Government of France in 2015.

Filmography

Film

Television

Honours 
 Chevalier of the Order of Arts and Letters (2015)

References

External links

 

1978 births
21st-century French male actors
Most Promising Actor César Award winners
French male film actors
French male television actors
Living people
Actors from Nancy, France
Chevaliers of the Ordre des Arts et des Lettres